Mario Gómez Martín (born 6 October 1992) is a Spanish footballer who plays for CF Talavera de la Reina as a central defender.

Football career
Born in Talavera de la Reina, Toledo, Mario finished his graduation with Rayo Vallecano's youth setup, and made his senior debuts with the reserves in the 2010–11 season, in Segunda División B.

On 15 January 2014 Mario made his first team debut, starting in a 0–1 away loss against Levante UD, for the campaign's Copa del Rey. It was his only appearance for the main squad, however.

On 4 July 2016, Mario signed for CF Gavà also in the third level.

References

External links

1992 births
Living people
People from Talavera de la Reina
Sportspeople from the Province of Toledo
Spanish footballers
Footballers from Castilla–La Mancha
Association football defenders
Segunda División B players
Tercera División players
Rayo Vallecano B players
Rayo Vallecano players
CF Gavà players
CD Badajoz players
Mérida AD players
CF Talavera de la Reina players